The men's BMX racing competition at the 2020 Summer Olympics took place on 29 and 30 July 2021 at the Ariake Urban Sports Park. 24 cyclists from 17 nations competed in the event.

Background 
This was the 4th appearance of the event, which has been held at every Summer Olympics since BMX racing was added to the programme in 2008.

The reigning Olympic champion was Connor Fields of the United States, and the reigning (2019) World Champion was Twan van Gendt of the Netherlands.

A preview by Olympics.com noted the favourites as Fields, van Gendt, Niek Kimmann (also of the Netherlands), Joris Daudet of France, and Carlos Ramírez of Colombia.

Fields suffered a horrific crash in his semi-final heat and was unable to continue racing. He was hospitalized.

Qualification 

A National Olympic Committee (NOC) could enter up to three qualified cyclists in the BMX race. Quota places are allocated to the NOC, which selects the cyclists. There were 24 quota places available, allocated as follows:

 UCI nation ranking (18 places): The top two NOCs each earn three places. NOCs ranked third to fifth each earn two places. NOCs ranked sixth through 11th each earn one place. Each continent was guaranteed one place.
 UCI elite individual ranking (three places): The three NOCs with the top individuals on this ranking, which have not yet earned any quota places, each earn one place.
 2020 World Championships (two places): The top two NOCs at the 2020 UCI BMX World Championships, which have not yet earned any quota places, each earn one place. Because the 2020 World Championships were cancelled due to the COVID-19 pandemic, these places were reallocated to the UCI nation ranking.
 Host place (one place): Host nation Japan was guaranteed one place.

Competition format 
The competition was a three-round tournament, with quarterfinals, semifinals, and a final. The time-trial seeding run from previous Games was eliminated. In each round, the cyclists raced around a  course with jumps and banked turns. The competition proceeded as follows:

 Quarterfinals: four heats of six cyclists each. Each heat had three runs, using a point-for-place system (one point for the winner of a run, two points for second, etc.), with the lowest points over the three runs winning. The best four cyclists in each heat (16 total) advanced to the semifinals; the others (eight cyclists) were eliminated.
 Semifinals: two heats of eight cyclists each. Again there were three runs per heat, using the point-for-place system. The top four cyclists in each semifinal (eight total) advanced to the final; the others (eight cyclists) were eliminated.
 Final: one final of eight cyclists. There was only a single run.

Schedule 
The event took place over two consecutive days.

Results

Quarterfinals 
Sources:

Heat 1

Heat 2

Heat 3

Heat 4

Semifinals 
Sources:

Heat 1

Heat 2

Final 
Sources:

See also 
 Cycling at the 2020 Summer Olympics – Women's BMX racing
 Cycling at the 2020 Summer Olympics – Men's keirin
 Cycling at the 2020 Summer Olympics – Men's BMX freestyle

References 

Men's BMX
BMX at the Summer Olympics
2021 in BMX
Men's events at the 2020 Summer Olympics